Brush Creek is a  long 3rd order tributary to the Banister River in Halifax County, Virginia.

Course 
Brush Creek rises about 0.5 miles southwest of North Stanton, Virginia in Halifax County and then flows south-southwest to join the Banister River about 2 miles southwest of Hickory Grove.

Watershed 
Brush Creek drains  of area, receives about 45.3 in/year of precipitation, has a wetness index of 338.90, and is about 56% forested.

See also 
 List of Virginia Rivers

References 

Rivers of Virginia
Rivers of Halifax County, Virginia]
Tributaries of the Roanoke River